Manjhitar is a small town in the Indian state of Sikkim. It is under the jurisdiction of the district of South Sikkim. The Sikkim Manipal University is situated here.

Geography 

References

External links 
 Satellite image of Manjhitar

Cities and towns in Namchi district